Moldavite is a forest green, olive green or blue greenish vitreous silica projectile glass formed by a meteorite impact in southern Germany (Nördlinger Ries Crater) that occurred about 15 million years ago. It is a type of tektite.

Early studies
Moldavite was introduced to the scientific public for the first time in 1786 as "chrysolites" from Týn nad Vltavou in a lecture by Josef Mayer of Prague University, read at a meeting of the Bohemian Scientific Society (Mayer 1788). Zippe (1836) first used the term "moldavite", derived from the Moldau (Vltava) river in Bohemia (the Czech Republic), from where the first described pieces came.

Origin
In 1900, Franz Eduard Suess pointed out that the gravel-size moldavites exhibited curious pittings and wrinkles on the surface, which could not be due to the action of water, but resembled the characteristic markings on many meteorites. He attributed the material to a cosmic origin and regarded moldavites as a special type of meteorite for which he proposed the name of tektite. Moldavites' highly textured surfaces are now known to be the result of pervasive etching by naturally occurring  and humic acids present in groundwater. Because of their extremely low water content and chemical composition, the current consensus among earth scientists is that moldavites were formed about 14.7 million years ago during the impact of a giant meteorite in the present-day Nördlinger Ries crater. The impact melted material and launched it into the air. As the material was airborne, it cooled and solidified. Currently, moldavites have been found in an area that includes southern Bohemia, western Moravia, the Cheb Basin (northwest Bohemia), Lusatia (Germany), and Waldviertel (Austria). Isotope analysis of samples of moldavites have shown a beryllium-10 isotope composition similar to the composition of Australasian tektites (australites) and Ivory Coast tektites (ivorites).

Most moldavites are from South Bohemian localities, with just a few found in South Moravian localities. Rare moldavites have been found in the Lusatian area (near Dresden), Cheb basin area (West Bohemia) and Northern Austria (near Radessen). Principal occurrences of moldavites in Bohemia are associated with Tertiary sediments of the České Budějovice and Třeboň basins. The most prominent localities are concentrated in a NW-SE strip along the western margin of the České Budějovice Basin. The majority of these occurrences are bound to the Vrábče Member and Koroseky Sandy Gravel. Prominent localities in the Třeboň Basin are bound to gravels and sands of the Domanín Formation.

In Moravia, moldavite occurrences are restricted to an area roughly bounded by the towns of Třebíč, Znojmo and Brno. The colour of Moravian moldavites usually differs from their Bohemian counterparts, as it tends to be brownish. Taking into account the number of pieces found, Moravian localities are considerably less productive than the Bohemian ones; however, the average weight of the moldavites found is much higher. The oldest (primary) moldavite-bearing sediments lie between Slavice and Třebíč. The majority of other localities in southern Moravia are associated with sediments of Miocene as well as Pleistocene rivers that flowed across this area more or less to the southeast, similar to the present streams of Jihlava, Oslava and Jevišovka.

Properties
The chemical formula of moldavite is SiO2(+Al2O3). Its properties are similar to those of other types of glass, and reported Mohs hardness varies from 5.5 to 7. Moldavite can be transparent or translucent with a mossy green color, with swirls and bubbles accentuating its mossy appearance. Moldavites can be distinguished from most green glass imitations by observing their worm-like schlieren.

Use

Moldavites were discovered by prehistoric people in the Czech Republic and Austria and were used to make flaked tools.  Some of the worked moldavites date to the Aurignacian period of the Upper Paleolithic, approximately 43,000 to 26,000 years before the present.

In the modern world, moldavites are often used, rough or cut, as semi-precious stones in jewelry.  They have purported metaphysical qualities and are often used in crystal healing.

Presentation
There is the Moldavite Museum in Český Krumlov, Czech Republic. The Moldavite Association was established in Ljubljana, Slovenia in 2014. The association researches, exhibits and promotes moldavites and other tektites around the world and has member geologists from more than 30 countries worldwide.

Gallery

References

 J. Baier: Zur Herkunft und Bedeutung der Ries-Auswurfprodukte für den Impakt-Mechanismus. - Jber. Mitt. oberrhein. geol. Ver., N. F. 91, 9-29, 2009.
 J. Baier: Die Auswurfprodukte des Ries-Impakts, Deutschland, in Documenta Naturae, Vol. 162, München, 2007.

Further reading
 Milan PRCHAL "60 years on the green wave". (Robert Jelinek, Admir Mesic Eds). Der Konterfei 072, Vienna, 2021.

External links

Moldavite Museum in Český Krumlov

Gemstones
Glass in nature
Impact event minerals